Vim Karénine (born August 6, 1933) is an American and French poet, a haiku poet and a novelist.

Biography

Vim Karénine (Antony de Vial), son of François de Vial who was a diplomat and a Minister Plenipotentiary of France, was born in Poitiers, France, and grew up in Switzerland, Hungary, and Italy. His family moved afterwards to Canada. After his secondary education at Collège Stanislas (Quebec), in Montreal, Karénine moved to Paris, France. He earned a bachelor's degree from the University of Poitiers  Vim published his first poems in a student journal.

He enlisted in the French Navy for two years, and served aboard the cruiser Jeanne d' Arc,  visiting the Far East, North and South America, Australia and New Zealand.  Antony de Vial graduated from the Carmes Seminary in Paris, to become a Catholic priest on December 17, 1966. He then moved to the United States, involving himself with A. I. M. groups.  He was a resident in Silver Spring, Maryland, near Washington D.C. and Baltimore, and acquired U. S. citizenship.

Karénine usually writes his poems on a computer, but if inspiration strikes him when he's away from it, "I've been known to start poems on napkins and scraps of paper, too".  He is known for his spontaneous method of writing, covering topics such as Catholic spirituality and travel.  In August 2012 his comprehensive collection of Emily Dickinson translations was published by Editions Orizons in France, with a general introduction by poet and editor .  He eventually retired to Paris.

Bibliography

	Ricercari 1971 Chambellan Edition  	PARIS	1971
	The Wall American Edition, translation by Louis Olivier PDE Editions 	 1976
	La fête à Caïn, Spanish translation by A.M. Diaz et F. Moreno PDE Editions Paris	 1978
	Brookling, Poetry revue -USA Vol. II, N°4 1979
	O America ! 		BB Editions 	 1991
	O America Book translated by Louis Oliver. MLTA 04144, Ghelderode Editions
	Shoals of Nebraska GC3 Kenneth White LTS Editions Geneva 		 1994
	"M" In folio 				BC Editions 1996
 Versant Nord (1997), novel
       The Work of Poetry (1997) criticism
	Récit d'une enfance américaine  Paris L'Harmattan editions Paris 2001
	Oasis New-York 	            L'Harmattan, Editions Paris2001
	Haïkus 		 L'Harmattan, Editions Paris 2001
	NEW YORK.9/11 L'Harmattan, Editions 2001
	Orizons Orizons Editions 2009
	Emily Dickinson Translated Poems Vim Karénine Orizons Editions Paris 2012
 Americadire poems  Éditions Orizons 2014
 Tao te king     French rewriting : Antoine de Vial  Orizons 2014

See also

François de Vial
Château Lynch-Bages
List of poets from the United States
Tao Te Ching

Notes

The Baltimore Sun : 1976 Vim karenine and modern poetry
Antoine de Vial:
Antoine de Vial as Vim Mark Karenine 
Emma Jones (2004) The Literary Companion Robson, 2004.
Keillor, Garrison. Writer's Almanac. March 6, 1998
BBC interview 1977: V.K. as a novel writer: "Everything comes from something else; you give it your spin. You couldn't not give it your spin."
Phil Daoust (2 December 1989). "Radio pick of the day: Karenine and the haiku shore"  guardian.co.uk. Retrieved 1989-12-12
 Raul Diaz Vial  El lignage de Vial Editiones Graphicas Madrid 
 Journal de Genève "L'oeuvre originale et les essais de V.M. Karenine"  1981
French Institute-Alliance Française de New York. - 1987 - Literary Criticism
"Vim Karenine": Oasis New-York," French Review, LI, no. 6 (May 1978), 916. BooksDocument utilisé pour la rédaction de l'article.
Vim Karenine translated by Louis Olvier. MLTA 04144 livre, Ghelderode : présentation, choix de textes, chronologie, bibliographie. Par Roland Beyen…
O America : Vim Karenine (Book, 1991)
Cavitch, Max, American Elegy: The Poetry of Mourning from the Puritans to Whitman (University of Minnesota Press, 2007). . Document utilisé pour la rédaction de l'article.
Hoover, Paul (ed): Postmodern American Poetry - A Norton Anthology (1994). 
Rutherford, Mildred. American Authors. Atlanta: The Franklin Printing and Publishing Co., 1902

Hoover, Paul (editor): Postmodern American Poetry - A Norton Anthology (1994). 
	Moore, Geoffrey (ed): The Penguin Book of American Verse (Revised edition 1983)  
Mary Oliver
	Winter Hours: Prose, Prose Poems, and Poems (1999) 
	Owls and Other Fantasies: poems and essays (2003)
	Why I Wake Early: New Poems (2004)
Gertrude  Stein     Stanzas in meditation and Other Poems (1929-1933), New Haven, Yale University Press, 1956.
Walt Whitman Echantillons de jours et recueils (1882-1883)
Arna Bontemps 1948 The Poetry of the Negro, 1746-1949: an anthology, edited by Langston Hughes and Arna Bontemps, (Garden City, NY: Doubleday, 1949)
	Virginia Wolf The Moment and Other Essays (1948)
	Virginia Wolf Journal d'un écrivain (1953), extraits du Journal de l'auteur.
	Virginia Wolf L'art du roman (1962)
	Virginia Wolf Instants de vie (Moments of Being) (1976)
	Virginia Wolf Correspondence 1923-1941, avec Vita Sackville-West (2010)
John Lehmann, Virginia Woolf and Her World (1975) 
Charles Olson The Collected Poems  (Berkeley, 1987)
Vies volées, "Emily Dickinson", de Christian Garcin, Climats, 1999 ; réédition Flammarion "Étonnants classiques", 2009.

Bernard Berenson Florentine Painters of the Renaissance (1896) The Bernard Berenson collection of Islamic Painting at Villa i Tatti : Turkman, Uzbek, and Safavid miniatures . 
	Bernard Berenson Lorenzo Lotto : An Essay in Constructive Art Criticism (1895)
	*Le Critique d'art, nouvelle de Dino Buzzati de 1969..
« Nabat », Encyclopedia of Islam, volume VII.
(en) Stephan G. Schmid ; « The Nabataeans. Travellers between Lifestyles », dans B. MacDonald - R. Adams - P. Bienkowski (éd.), The Archaeology of Jordan ; Sheffield, 2001 ; pages 367-426.
Oren, Eliezer D., ed. 2000. The Sea Peoples and Their World: A Reassessment. University Museum Monograph 108. Philadelphia: The University of Pennsylvania Museum of Archaeology and Anthropology
Schiffman Lawrence, Encyclopedia of the Dead Sea Scrolls, 2 vols. (New York: Oxford University Press, 2000)(with James C. VanderKam (eds.)
Pierre Grelot, Les juifs dans l'Évangile de Jean. Enquête historique et réflexion théologique, Gabalda et Cie, 1995
Vim karenine biography Milestone Editions  1999

References

Further reading
"Vim Karenine": Oasis New-York," French Review, LI, no. 6 (May 1978), 916. Books.
Bond, Bradley G. (2005). French Colonial Louisiana and the Atlantic World, LSU Press, 322 pages  (online excerpt)
Girod André " French-American Class" Publibook [1]
Jenkins, Lee M; Davis, Alex, ed. (2007). The Cambridge companion to modernist poetry. Cambridge University Press. pp. 1–7, 38, 156. .
Virginia Woolf and the Visible World, by Emily Dalgarno. Cambridge University Press, 2007. .
Kahn, Roger. Into My Own: The Remarkable People and Events that Shaped a Life. New York: St. Martin's, 2006. .
Lucy Larcom: Landscape in American Poetry (1879).
Emma Jones (2004) The Literary Companion Robson, 2004.
Randier, Jean (2006). La Royale: L'histoire illustrée de la Marine nationale française. .
The New Catholic Encyclopedia, Washington, DC: Catholic University of America: Washington, vol 3, 366
Michael Greer, "Ideology and Theory in Recent Experimental Writing or, the Naming of "Language Poetry," boundary 2, Vol.1 to 16, (Winter - Spring, 1989),
Sue Roe and Susan Sellers The Cambridge companion to Virginia Woolf. (Cambridge University Press, 2000)
Gray, Richard. A History of American Literature. Blackwell, 2004.
Reichardt, Mary R. Introduction. Encyclopedia of Catholic Literature. Vol. 1. Westport, Conn. [u.a.: Greenwood, 2004. Print.
American Indian Poetry - In the Spirit of Resistance [La Poésie Amérindienne - L'espirit de Résistance], Béatrice Machet, Place aux Sens Publishing, Nanterre/France, 2001.
Rogers, N.P. (1847). A Collection from the Newspaper Writings of Nathaniel Peabody Rogers. Concord, N.H.: John R. French
Johnson, Thomas H. (ed). 1960. The Complete Poems of Emily Dickinson. Boston: Little, Brown & Co.

1933 births
Living people
20th-century American novelists
American male novelists
20th-century French novelists
French emigrants to the United States
French poets
20th-century American poets
American male poets
American male essayists
20th-century American essayists
20th-century American male writers
Haiku poets